La Mojarra is an archaeological site in the Mexican state of Veracruz, located not far from the Gulf Coast at a bend in the Acula River.  It was continually occupied from the late Formative period (ca. 300 BCE) until perhaps as late as 1000 CE.

Not a large site, La Mojarra has been little excavated.  It covers roughly 1 km2 and consists of small mounds and a modest plaza.  Three kilns have been unearthed, which fired locally used orange pottery.

Nonetheless, La Mojarra and environs have yielded two important Epi-Olmec culture artifacts: La Mojarra Stela 1 and the Tuxtla Statuette.  Both of these artifacts contain what has been classified as Epi-Olmec script as well as very early Long Count calendar dates.

References

Diehl, Richard A. (2000) “Mojarra, La (Veraruz, Mexico),” in Archaeology of Ancient Mexico & Central America: an Encyclopedia; Routledge, London. 
Diehl, Richard A. (2004) The Olmecs: America’s First Civilization, Thames & Hudson, London.

Mesoamerican sites
Epi-Olmec sites
Former populated places in Mexico
Archaeological sites in Veracruz